The Happy Village is a 1955 West German comedy film directed by Rudolf Schündler and starring Hannelore Bollmann, Carl Hinrichs and Gerhard Riedmann. It is a remake of the 1934 German film Trouble with Jolanthe. It was shot at the Tempelhof Studios in West Berlin and the Bendestorf Studios outside Hamburg. Location shooting took place around Lüneburg Heath. The film's sets were designed by the art director Hans Kuhnert.

Cast
 Hannelore Bollmann as Anna Lamken
 Carl Hinrichs as Krischan Lamken
 Gerhard Riedmann as Walter Meiners, Lehrer
 Gardy Granass as Sophie Kordes
 Peter Carsten as Gerd Bunje, Müller
 Carla Hagen as Stine, Magd
 Günther Lüders as Hinnerk, Knecht
 Paul Westermeier as Konrad Husch, Gendarm
 Charlott Daudert as Erna Dünnschede
 Ernst Waldow as Heinrich Jeschke, Gerichtsvollzieher
 Georg Pahl as Opa Kordes, Schäfer
 Hansjoerg Boeger as Bauer Harms
 Otto Schroeder as Bauer Jochen

References

Bibliography 
 Williams, Alan. Film and Nationalism. Rutgers University Press, 2002.

External links 
 

1955 films
West German films
German comedy films
1955 comedy films
1950s German-language films
Films directed by Rudolf Schündler
German films based on plays
Remakes of German films
Gloria Film films
1950s German films
Films shot at Tempelhof Studios